Platyptiliodes is a genus of moths of the family Pterophoridae containing only one species, Platyptiliodes albisignatula, which is known from Equatorial Guinea.

References

Platyptiliini
Moths of Africa
Monotypic moth genera
Moths described in 1913